Ciper also known as CIPER Chile is a Chilean alternative media of digital journalism. Ciper is the Spanish acronym for "Journalistic Investigation Center" (Centro de Investigación Periodística). It is a nonprofit organization.

References

Non-profit organisations based in Chile
Chilean journalism organisations
Investigative journalism